The women's middleweight (60 kg/132 lbs) Low-Kick division at the W.A.K.O. European Championships 2004 in Budva was the third heaviest of the female Low-Kick tournaments and also the smallest involving just two fighters.  Each of the matches was three rounds of two minutes each and were fought under Low-Kick kickboxing rules.

As there were only two women both contestants went straight into the final.  The tournament gold medallist was Julia Nemtsova from Russia who defeated Sanja Ilic from Serbia and Montenegro by unanimous decision.  Nemtsova had previously won a silver in Full-Contact at the last world championships in Paris.

Results

Key

See also
List of WAKO Amateur European Championships
List of WAKO Amateur World Championships
List of female kickboxers

References

External links
 WAKO World Association of Kickboxing Organizations Official Site 

W.A.K.O. European Championships 2004 (Budva)